Homeobox protein Hox-B5 is a protein that in humans is encoded by the HOXB5 gene.

Function 

This gene is a member of the Antp homeobox family and encodes a nuclear protein with a homeobox DNA-binding domain. It is included in a cluster of homeobox B genes located on chromosome 17. The encoded protein functions as a sequence-specific transcription factor that is involved in lung and gut development. Increased expression of this gene is associated with a distinct biologic subset of acute myeloid leukemia (AML) and the occurrence of bronchopulmonary sequestration (BPS) and congenital cystic adenomatoid malformation (CCAM) tissue.

See also 
 Homeobox

References

Further reading

External links 
 
 

Transcription factors